Balanos is both a given name and surname. Notable people with the name include:

Balanos Vasilopoulos (1694–1760), Greek cleric, author, mathematician, physicist, and philosopher
Georgios Balanos (1944–2020), Greek author, publisher, and translator
Nikolaos Balanos (1869–1943), Greek architect

For the Egyptian perfume component, see Moringa peregrina.